In mathematics, the Hopf lemma, named after Eberhard Hopf, states that if a continuous real-valued function in a domain in Euclidean space with sufficiently smooth boundary is harmonic in the interior and the value of the function at a point on the boundary is greater than the values at nearby points inside the domain, then the derivative of the function in the direction of the outward pointing normal is strictly positive. The lemma is an important tool in the proof of the maximum principle and in the theory of partial differential equations. The Hopf lemma has been generalized to describe the behavior of the solution to an elliptic problem as it approaches a point on the boundary where its maximum is attained.

In the special case of the Laplacian, the Hopf lemma had been discovered by Stanisław Zaremba in 1910. In the more general setting for elliptic equations, it was found independently by Hopf and Olga Oleinik in 1952, although Oleinik's work is not as widely known as Hopf's in Western countries. There are also extensions which allow domains with corners.

Statement for harmonic functions
Let Ω be a bounded domain in Rn with smooth boundary. Let f be a real-valued function continuous on the closure of Ω and harmonic on Ω. If x is a boundary point such that f(x) > f(y) for all y in Ω sufficiently close to x, then the (one-sided) directional derivative of f in the direction of the outward pointing normal to the boundary at x is strictly positive.

Proof for harmonic functions
Subtracting a constant, it can be assumed that f(x) = 0 and f is strictly negative at interior points near x. Since the boundary of Ω is smooth there is a small ball contained in Ω the closure of which is tangent to the boundary at x and intersects the boundary only at x. It is then sufficient to check the result with Ω  replaced by this ball. Scaling and translating, it is enough to check the result for the unit ball in Rn, assuming f(x) is zero for some unit vector x and f(y) < 0 if |y| < 1.

By Harnack's inequality applied to −f

for r < 1. Hence

Hence the directional derivative at x is bounded below by the strictly positive constant on the right hand side.

General discussion
Consider  a second order, uniformly elliptic operator of the form

The Weak Maximum Principle states that a solution of the equation  in  attains its maximum value on the closure  at some point on the boundary .  Let  be such a point, then necessarily 

where  denotes the outer normal derivative. This is simply a consequence of the fact that  must be nondecreasing as  approach .

A precise statement of the Lemma is as follows. Let  be of class  and satisfy the differential inequality 

Let  be given so that .

The above result can be generalized in several respects. It is also possible to consider functions  that take positive values, provided that . For the proof and other discussion, see the references below.

See also
Hopf maximum principle

References

 
 

 (The Hopf lemma is referred to as "Zaremba's principle" by Taylor.)

External links
 Hayk Mikayelyan, Henrik Shahgholian   Hopf's lemma for a class of singular/degenerate PDE-s
   Hopf's lemma for a class of fractional singular/degenerate PDE-s
 D. E. Apushkinskaya, A. I. Nazarov   A counterexample to the Hopf-Oleinik lemma (elliptic case)

Partial differential equations
Mathematical principles